Chinna Chokkikulam is a neighbourhood in Madurai district of Tamil Nadu state in the peninsular India.

Madurai, Sellur, Narimedu, B B Kulam, Simmakkal, Tallakulam, K. Pudur, Goripalayam, Shenoy Nagar, Yanaikkal, Nelpettai, East Gate, Thathaneri, Koodal Nagar and Arappalayam are some of the important neighbourhoods of Chinna Chokkikulam.

Chinna Chokkikulam area falls under the Madurai North Assembly constituency. The winner of the election held in the year 2021 as the member of its assembly constituency is G. Thalapathi. Also, this area belongs to Madurai Lok Sabha constituency. S. Venkatesan won the 2019 elections, as the member of its Lok Sabha constituency.

References

External links 
 Geohack

Neighbourhoods and suburbs of Madurai